The 1940 Green Bay Packers season was their 22nd season overall and their 20th season in the National Football League. The defending NFL champions, Green Bay finished with a 6–4–1 record under founder and head coach Curly Lambeau, earning them a second-place finish in the Western Conference.

Offseason

NFL draft

Regular season

Schedule

Standings

Roster

Awards, records and honors

References

Sportsencyclopedia.com

Green Bay Packers seasons
Green Bay Packers
Green Bay Packers